"Cut Across Shorty" is a song written by Marijohn Wilkin and Wayne P. Walker, made popular by Eddie Cochran. It was the b-side of his number 1 UK hit "Three Steps To Heaven" and the last song he ever recorded.

Personnel
 Eddie Cochran: vocal and rhythm guitar
 Sonny Curtis: guitar
 Conrad 'Guybo' Smith: electric bass
 Jerry Allison: drums

Johnny Hallyday version

The song was covered in French by Johnny Hallyday. His version (titled "Cours plus vite Charlie") was released in 1968 and spent two weeks at no. 1 on the singles sales chart in France (from 9 to 20 November). In Wallonia (French Belgium) his single spent 18 weeks on the chart, peaking at number 9.

Track listing 
7" single Philips B 370 743 F (France, etc.)

A. "Cours plus vite Charlie" ("Cut Across Shorty") (2:22)
B. "J'ai peur je t'aime" (2:43)

Charts

Rod Stewart version
"Cut Across Shorty" was also recorded by Rod Stewart for his 1970 album Gasoline Alley, with Ronnie Wood playing several instruments. In 1993, Stewart reunited with Wood for a session of MTV Unplugged. During the session they recorded a version of "Cut Across Shorty" which was included on the album Unplugged...and Seated.

Other versions
 Carl Smith 1960 (#28 country)
 Freddie and the Dreamers October 1964 
 Nat Stuckey 1969 (#15 country)
 Rod Stewart 1970; a 1993 live single went to #16 on the US rock charts
 Faces 1974 
 Mud 1978
 The Head Cat 2006
 The 99ers 2012

External links
https://web.archive.org/web/20080516080201/http://www.eddiecochran.info/Discography/USA/V.htm discography
http://pcuf.fi/~tapiov/discographies/cochran_connection.htm discography

References

1960 songs
1960 singles
1968 singles
Eddie Cochran songs
Rod Stewart songs
Johnny Hallyday songs
Songs written by Marijohn Wilkin
Song recordings produced by Snuff Garrett
Philips Records singles